Schinia obliqua is a moth of the family Noctuidae. It is found in North America including California and Colorado.

Schinia unimacula was synonymized with Schinia obliqua in 1996 by Hardwick, but resurrected from synonymy in 2003 by Pogue and Harp.

The wingspan is about 23 mm.

External links
Images

Schinia
Moths of North America
Moths described in 1883